Coenonycha is a genus of May beetles and junebugs in the family Scarabaeidae. There are more than 30 described species in Coenonycha.

Species
These 34 species belong to the genus Coenonycha:

 Coenonycha acuta Cazier, 1943
 Coenonycha ampla Cazier, 1943
 Coenonycha barri Cazier, 1943
 Coenonycha bowlesi Cazier, 1943
 Coenonycha clementina Casey, 1909
 Coenonycha clypeata McClay, 1943
 Coenonycha crispata McClay, 1943
 Coenonycha dimorpha Evans, 1986
 Coenonycha fuga Cazier, 1943
 Coenonycha fulva McClay, 1943
 Coenonycha fusca McClay, 1943
 Coenonycha globosa McClay, 1943
 Coenonycha hageni Cazier, 1943
 Coenonycha lurida Cazier, 1943
 Coenonycha mediata Cazier, 1943
 Coenonycha ochreata Evans, 1986
 Coenonycha ovatis McClay, 1943
 Coenonycha ovipennis Horn, 1876
 Coenonycha pallida Cazier, 1943
 Coenonycha parvula Fall, 1901
 Coenonycha pascuensis Potts, 1945
 Coenonycha purshiae Cazier, 1943
 Coenonycha pygmaea Smith, 1986
 Coenonycha rotundata (LeConte, 1856)
 Coenonycha rubida McClay, 1943
 Coenonycha santacruzae Evans, 1986
 Coenonycha saylori Cazier, 1943
 Coenonycha scotti McClay, 1943
 Coenonycha sleeperi Evans, 1988
 Coenonycha socialis Horn, 1876
 Coenonycha stohleri Saylor, 1935
 Coenonycha testacea Cazier, 1937
 Coenonycha tingi Cazier, 1937
 Coenonycha utahensis McClay, 1943

References

Further reading

 
 
 
 
 

Melolonthinae
Articles created by Qbugbot